Chungthang subdivision is one of the two sub-districts of North Sikkim district, in the state of Sikkim, India. Chungthang is the headquarters. It contains nine census-designated villages:

Chungthang
Lachen
Lachung
Shipgyer
Tung
Lachen Forest Block
Thangu Forest Block
Lachung Forest Block
Chungthang Forest Block

References

Mangan district